Badar Munir (1940 – 11 October 2008) was a Pakistani film actor. Originally from Madyan in the state of Swat, he starred in over 732 Pashto, Urdu and Punjabi language films from 1969 to 2008.

Early life and career
Badar Munir was raised with a religious background in Swat. He completed his basic elementary school education there and then came to Karachi.

Before joining films, Badar Munir used to drive Rikshaw on Karachi streets. Then he got a job as a lighting technician on actor Waheed Murad's recommendation in a Karachi film studio. He was introduced by Waheed Murad to the film industry in 1970. His first movie was Yousuf Khan Sher Bano (1970), with Yasmin Khan as the heroine. This Pashto language film was the first film of Pakistan film industry in this language in 1970. In 2016, city of Karachi has the largest urban population of Pashto-speaking people in the world, larger than even in Peshawar, Kabul, Quetta and Kandahar.

Filmography

Death and legacy
Before his death, Badar Munir had been suffering from kidney and diabetes problems for the past 5 years. He had a paralysis attack a few years ago. Two days before his death, he had a heart attack and was hospitalized but later died on 11 October 2008.

See also
 List of Lollywood actors

References

External links
 
Filmography of Badar Munir on Complete Index To World Film website
 Badar munir favorite website 

1940 births
2008 deaths
People from Swat District
People from Peshawar
Pashtun people
Pakistani male film actors
Male actors from Karachi
Recipients of the Pride of Performance
Male actors in Urdu cinema
Male actors in Pashto cinema